Armillaria duplicata is a species of mushroom in the family Physalacriaceae. This species is found in Asia.

See also 
 List of Armillaria species

References 

duplicata
Fungal tree pathogens and diseases